Main Point is a settlement in Newfoundland and Labrador. It is part of Main Point-Davidsville. As of 2023, it has a population of around 350 people.

Populated places in Newfoundland and Labrador